Solar power in Connecticut makes Connecticut the second state in the US to reach grid parity, after Hawaii, due to the high average cost of electricity. Installing solar panels for a home provides an estimated 15.6% return on investment.

CT Solar Lease was a program to install solar panels at no upfront cost, and a fixed lease price for 15 years, with an option to extend the lease for 5 years at a reduced cost. CT Solar Lease owns and sells the RECs generated by the system, but turns over all but $15/REC plus 100% of the sale over $30 or 50% of the sale of the REC up to $30/REC to the homeowner in a Solar Dividends account for maintenance and to allow the purchase of the system at the end of the lease. RECs have been selling for from $18 to $24 each. Applications ended on August 19, 2011.

Regulations
Connecticut's renewable portfolio standard requires 7% of power in the state will be from renewable resources by 2010, and 23% by 2020. A bill passed in 2011 requires incentives that will produce at least 30 MW of new residential PV installed by the end of 2022. Net metering is available for all up to 2 MW sites, and is reconciled annually at either the avoided cost or the time of use/generation rate, which is higher but requires time of use metering.

Statistics

Potential generation
The average insolation in Connecticut is about 4 sun hours per day, and ranges from less than 2 in the winter to over 5 in the summer.

Source: NREL

Installed capacity
Connecticut electricity consumption in 2005 was 33,095 million kWh.

Utility-scale generation

See also

Wind power in Connecticut
Solar power in the United States
Renewable energy in the United States

References

External links
CT Clean Energy

Energy in Connecticut
Connecticut
Solar power in Connecticut